Poienarii de Argeș is a commune in Argeș County, Muntenia, Romania. It is composed of four villages: Ceaurești, Ioanicești, Poienari (the commune center) and Tomulești.

References

Communes in Argeș County
Localities in Muntenia